Lydia Steinbach (born 30 July 1980) is a German former professional tennis player.

Biography
Steinbach was born in the city of Chemnitz, which was then known as Karl-Marx-Stadt and part of East Germany.

A right-handed player, Steinbach reached a best singles ranking of 262. In 2001 she won an ITF tournament in San Severo, beating Svetlana Kuznetsova in the final. Her best performance on the WTA Tour came at the Pattaya Open in 2003, where she made the round of 16.

As a doubles player she won 10 ITF titles and was ranked as high as 176 in the world. At the 2003 Sparkassen Cup in Leipzig, Steinbach and partner Aniko Kapros held a match point against top seeds Martina Navratilova and Svetlana Kuznetsova, before going down 5–7 in the third set.

While studying sports at university she was a participant in the 2003 Summer Universiade in Daegu, winning bronze medals for both the women's doubles and mixed doubles events.

ITF finals

Singles (1–6)

Doubles (10–7)

References

External links
 
 

1980 births
Living people
German female tennis players
Sportspeople from Chemnitz
Universiade medalists in tennis
Universiade bronze medalists for Germany
Medalists at the 2003 Summer Universiade